Itarhi is a village and corresponding community development block in Buxar district of Bihar, India. According to the 2011 Census of India, its population is 10,275, in 1,711 households, while the total block population is 170,629, in 25,557 households.

Demographics 

Itarhi is an entirely rural block, with no major urban centres. As of 2011, the sex ratio of the block was 937 females to every 1000 males, which was higher than the Buxar district ratio of 922. The sex ratio was higher in the 0-6 age group, where it was 946 in Itarhi block compared to 934 in Buxar district overall. Members of scheduled castes made up 18.05% of the block's population, and members of scheduled tribes made up 1.18%. The overall literacy rate of the block was 68.77% (79.65% among men and 57.14% of women), slightly below the district rate of 70.14%.

In 2011, most of Itarhi block's workforce was employed in agriculture, with  33.64% of workers being cultivators who owned or leased their own land and another 52.04% being agricultural labourers who worked someone else's land for wages. A further 1.74% were household industry workers (the lowest proportion in Buxar district) and the remaining 12.58% were other workers.

Villages 
There are 167 villages in Itarhi block, 133 of which are inhabited and 34 of which are uninhabited.

References 

Villages in Buxar district